is a Japanese manga series written and illustrated by George Asakura. It has been serialized in Shogakukan's seinen manga magazine Weekly Big Comic Spirits since September 2015. An anime television series adaptation produced by MAPPA aired from April to June 2022 on the Super Animeism programming block.

Synopsis
Junpei Murao used to not like ballet, but after seeing a man perform it, he suddenly finds himself fascinated by the art. His father dies in a tragic accident and Junpei gives up ballet to be "masculine". However one day, a new transfer student named Miyako Godai arrives who brings about his love for ballet once again.

Characters

A 14 year old boy who took a liking to ballet since he was younger. He cut his aspirations short after his father, a stunt performer, passed away. Due to being the only male of his he took his uncle's advise to become more "masculine" to be a pillar of support to his family and quit ballet, instead practicing Jeet Kune Do under his tutelage. Upon his encounter with Miyako, Junpei's passion for ballet is reignited and begins to rediscover himself and his meaning of masculinity after seeing Luou dance. Although a talented dancer, Junpei struggles in learning ballet due to lacking the fundamentals of the art as he lacked continuous training and tends to prioritize his own emotions over proper technique. However, he is noted by many to have prodigious characteristics and an ideal body for ballet. Through multitude tribulations, he comes to grasp the essence of ballet while humbling himself in the process, growing more mature as a person and dancer.

A shy 14-year-old boy, he is Miyako's cousin. The son of an american idol, he was abandoned by his mother following a scandal that exposed him as the son of her mother with another man who was not her husband. Raised by her strict, ballet obsessed grandmother, Luou grew under a physically and emotionally abusive environment with little to no contact with the outside world, learning only ballet. As a result, Luou has weak social skills, but his dancing prowess is unparalleled. Despite his tremendous skill, Luou's social reclusion weakens his ability to learn and express himself properly. Luou is in love with Miyako and sees Junpei as a nuisance, but it is through their adventures, that he is able to break out of his shell and grow more as a person.

Luou's cousin. A 14 year old girl and the daughter of Chizuru. Miyako has learned ballet from her mother since an early age. Although skilled, Miyako's personality is deemed unsuitable by her mother to perform in large roles. Miyako discovers Junpei's ability and realizes he has skill for ballet which causes him to reignite his passion for the dance. A kind and polite girl, Miyako has conflicted feelings about Junpei and Luou, both of whom she cares for. She worries for Luou in particular, being aware of his circumstances.

A sixth-grade girl, and the daughter of Ayako. Natuski is a very talented dancer whose skill is leagues above her peers, but is generally too serious and her expressions are inadequate. Proud and perfectionist, Natsuki puts tremendous effort in ballet, striving to be the best. The two have many in common in terms of how they view ballet and have been able to dance in perfect sync. Natsuki in fact feels attracted to Junpei as a dancer, as his expessive dancing matches her own views. There are hints of mutual romantic feelings between the two.

Media

Manga
Dance Dance Danseur, written and illustrated by George Asakura, started in Shogakukan's seinen manga magazine Weekly Big Comic Spirits on September 14, 2015. Shogakukan has collected its chapters into individual tankōbon volumes. The first volume was released on February 12, 2016. As of August 30, 2022, twenty-four volumes have been released.

Volume list

Anime
In April 2021, it was announced that Dance Dance Danseur will receive an anime television series adaptation. The series is produced by MAPPA and directed by Munehisa Sakai, with Yoshimi Narita writing the series' scripts, Hitomi Hasegawa designing the characters, and Michiru composing the music. It aired from April 9 to June 18, 2022, on the Super Animeism block on MBS, TBS and other channels. The opening theme song is "Narihibiku Kagiri" by Yuki, while the ending theme song is "Kaze, Hana" by Hitorie.

Disney+ acquired exclusive streaming rights to the series under Star in Japan. Crunchyroll licensed the series outside of Asia. Medialink licensed the series in Southeast Asia, Hong Kong, South Korea and Taiwan. They began streaming it exclusively also on Disney+ Hotstar in Indonesia, Malaysia, and Thailand from May 13, 2022 and on Disney+ in Hong Kong, Taiwan, and Singapore from May 25, 2022.

Episode list

Reception
Dance Dance Danseur was one of the Jury Recommended Works at the 23rd Japan Media Arts Festival in 2020.

Notes

References

Further reading

External links
 
 

2022 anime television series debuts
Anime series based on manga
Animeism
Books about ballet
Crunchyroll anime
Dance in anime and manga
MAPPA
Seinen manga
Shogakukan manga